Athens is an unincorporated community in Caroline County, in the U.S. state of Virginia. It is a farming community along Virginia State Route 207 west of Milford.

References

Unincorporated communities in Virginia
Unincorporated communities in Caroline County, Virginia